Frederick Kalms (1897–1977) was an Australian tennis player. His good all-round game was marred by a weak forehand. Kalms was New South Wales state champion in 1926 and 1928.  He reached the semi finals of the 1924 Australian Championships (beating Clarence Treloar and Rupert Wertheim before losing to Richard Schlesinger). At the 1924 U.S. Championships, Kalms lost in five sets in the second round to Dean Mathey. Kalms reached the quarter finals of the Australian in 1925 (losing to Pat O'Hara Wood) and 1928 (beating Edgar Moon before losing to Jack Cummings).

Grand Slam finals

Doubles (1 runner-up)

References

1897 births
1977 deaths
Australian male tennis players
Tennis people from New South Wales